"Countryfied" is a song written by Canadian country music artist Dick Damron. The song debuted at number 43 on the RPM Country Tracks chart on July 18, 1970. It peaked at number 1 on September 26, 1970.

"Countryfied" was covered by American country music artist George Hamilton IV on his 1971 album North Country. Hamilton's version was released as the album's first single in April 1971. It peaked at number 35 on the Billboard Hot Country Singles chart. It also reached number 1 on the RPM Country Tracks chart in Canada.

Chart performance

Dick Damron

George Hamilton IV

References

1970 singles
1971 singles
Dick Damron songs
George Hamilton IV songs
Songs written by Dick Damron